Joburg Super Kings is a South African professional Twenty20 franchise cricket team that first competed in the inaugural season of SA20 tournament. The team is based in Johannesburg, South Africa, and was formed in 2022. The team's home-ground is the Wanderers Stadium, Johannesburg. The team is captained by Faf du Plessis and is coached by Stephen Fleming.

The franchise is owned by the India Cements.

Current squad
The team's squad for the first season of the competition was:
 Players with international caps are listed in bold

Statistics

Most runs

Most wickets

Administration and support staff

References

External links
 Joburg Super Kings Official Website
 Super Kings section of the SA 20 website

Cricket in South Africa
2022 establishments in South Africa
Sport in Johannesburg
Cricket clubs established in 2022
Sports clubs in South Africa
SA20
India Cements